Tuhaň is name of several locations in the Czech Republic: 
Tuhaň (Česká Lípa District) 
Tuhaň (Mělník District)